Cetradonia is a lichen genus in the family Cladoniaceae. A monotypic genus, Cetradonia contains the single species Cetradonia linearis (formerly known as Cladonia linearis and as Gymnoderma lineare). The genus was circumscribed in 2002 by Jiang-Chun Wei and Teuvo Ahti. The genus was once placed in the family Cetradoniaceae (created in 2002) until that family was subsumed into the Cladoniaceae in 2006.

Cetradonia linearis, commonly known as the rock gnome lichen, is a squamulose lichen found in the higher elevations of the southern Appalachian Mountains.  Populations are only known to exist in Georgia, North Carolina, South Carolina and Tennessee.  The lichen occurs only in frequent fog, or in deep river gorges. Because of its specialized habitat requirements and heavy collection for scientific purposes, the lichen has been listed as an endangered species since January 18, 1995. It is only one of two lichens on the endangered species list, the other being the Florida perforate cladonia.

See also
List of fungi by conservation status

References

External links

Photograph of Rock gnome lichen
USFWS. Rock Gnome Lichen Recovery Plan. September 1997.

Cladoniaceae
Lichen genera
Monotypic Lecanorales genera
Fungi of the United States
Taxa described in 2002
Taxa named by Teuvo Ahti